The Lion Bridge is a historic cantilever bridge built over the Tuolumne River in central Stanislaus County which connects the city of Modesto, California on the north with the census-designated places of Shackelford and Bystrom on the south.

See also 
 Lions' Bridge, Sofia, Bulgaria.

References

Bridges completed in 1916
Transportation buildings and structures in Stanislaus County, California
Road bridges in California
Cantilever bridges in the United States